Cristiano Zanetti (born 10 April 1977) is a retired Italian footballer who played as a midfielder and current football coach. He was most recently in charge of Massese.

Zanetti played for several Italian clubs throughout his career, winning titles with Fiorentina, Roma, Inter, and Juventus. At international level, he represented the Italy national football team at the 2000 Summer Olympics, at the 2002 FIFA World Cup and at UEFA Euro 2004.

Club career

Early career
He played for Fiorentina (1993–96), Venezia (1996–97), and Reggiana (1997–98), before he joined the defending UEFA Cup Champions Inter Milan at age of 21, in 1998, where he played alongside his unrelated namesake, Argentine fullback Javier Zanetti. Zanetti made his club debut for Internazionale on 26 August 1998 against FC Skonto before joining Cagliari along with Mohamed Kallon. During his time with Fiorentina, he won a Coppa Italia in 1996.

Roma
In the summer of 1999, he was signed by Roma in a joint-ownership bid for 7 billion Italian lire. Under manager Fabio Capello, he soon became a member of the starting line-up and he won a Scudetto with Roma during the 2000–01 season.

Inter Milan
In June 2001, Zanetti re-joined Inter Milan under manager Héctor Cúper; Inter paid 10 billion Italian lire to buy back Zanetti. He was a regular starter under Cuper, and with the club he managed to the reach of the semi-finals of the 2001–02 UEFA Cup and the 2002–03 UEFA Champions League, also narrowly missing out on the Serie A title both of those seasons. The 2003–04 season was more disappointing, however, and upon the arrival of new manager Roberto Mancini, he was deployed with less frequency due to injuries, as well as the arrivals of Edgar Davids and Esteban Cambiasso in midfield, although he was finally able to capture some silverware during his final two seasons at the club. During his second stint with Inter, he won two Coppa Italia trophies in 2005 and 2006, a Supercoppa Italiana in 2005, and he was also awarded a Serie A title after the Calciopoli scandal in 2006.

Juventus
Zanetti moved to Juventus in 2006 on a free transfer, despite the match-fixing controversy surrounding the Turin giants and their subsequent relegation. Zanetti was Luciano Moggi's final signing as the Juventus transfer director before his five-year ban due to his role in the Calciopoli scandal. Zanetti won the Serie B title with Le Zebre in 2007, earning Juventus Serie A promotion. The following season, he helped Juventus to a third place in Serie A, which allowed them to qualify for the UEFA Champions League in 2008. Juventus were eliminated in the round of 16, and they reached the semi-finals of the Coppa Italia, also finishing second in Serie A.

Fiorentina
Zanetti signed with his first professional club Fiorentina on 10 August 2009, as the club was preparing to play in 2009–10 UEFA Champions League play-off round. He signed a 2+1 contract. He is the second player to join La Viola from Juventus in 2009–10 season after Marco Marchionni. Zanetti was tagged for €2 million and deducted from Felipe Melo transfer fee. He made his debut for ACF Fiorentina on 29 September 2009 against Liverpool in the group stage of the UEFA Champions League. His assist led to Fiorentina's first goal, scored by young Montenegrin Stevan Jovetić. Fiorentina eventually won the match 2–0.

Brescia
On 31 January 2011, Zanetti signed for Brescia on a two-year contract. He retired before the conclusion of the 2011–12 Serie B season, however, after cancelling his contract with the club.

International career
Zanetti represented Italy at Under-21 level on 19 occasions, winning the 2000 UEFA European Under-21 Championship under manager Marco Tardelli; he also took part in the 2000 Summer Olympics in Sydney with Italy, where the team was eliminated in the quarter-finals. He subsequently played for the Italian senior national team at the 2002 FIFA World Cup and at UEFA Euro 2004. In total, he won 17 caps for the national side between 2001 and 2004, under Giovanni Trapattoni, and he scored one goal in a 2–1 friendly away win over Switzerland, on 30 April 2003.

Style of play
Zanetti has been described as a hardworking and tough tackling defensive midfielder, with good vision, technique, passing ability, and a controlling influence on the midfield, and was known in particular for his ability to break down possession and subsequently start attacking plays, which also enabled him to be deployed as a central midfielder, or even as a deep-lying playmaker in front of the defence; he was also deployed as a left-sided offensive-minded central midfielder on occasion, known as the mezzala role in Italian football jargon. Despite his talents, he was often injury-prone throughout his career.

Managerial career
In 2013 Zanetti accepted an offer to become youth coach at Pisa, heading the Giovanissimi Nazionali (Under-16). In 2014, he became a coaching graduate and obtained a UEFA Pro Licence. In 2014 become youth coach at Prato.

Career statistics

Club

International

Scores and results list Italy's goal tally first, score column indicates score after each Zanetti goal.

Managerial statistics
Updated 10 April 2021

Honours
Fiorentina
Coppa Italia: 1995–96

Roma
Serie A: 2000–01

Inter Milan
Serie A: 2005–06 
Coppa Italia: 2004–05, 2005–06
Supercoppa Italiana: 2005

Juventus
Serie B: 2006–07

Italy U21
UEFA European Under-21 Championship: 2000

References

External links

FIGC 

1977 births
Living people
People from Carrara
Association football midfielders
Italian footballers
Italy international footballers
Olympic footballers of Italy
Italy under-21 international footballers
Italy youth international footballers
Footballers at the 2000 Summer Olympics
2002 FIFA World Cup players
UEFA Euro 2004 players
ACF Fiorentina players
Venezia F.C. players
A.C. Reggiana 1919 players
Cagliari Calcio players
Inter Milan players
A.S. Roma players
Juventus F.C. players
Brescia Calcio players
Serie A players
Serie B players
Sportspeople from the Province of Massa-Carrara
Footballers from Tuscany